Aleksandr Yuryevich Gorbatyuk (born 21 April 1985) is a Russian former professional football player.

Club career
He made his Russian Premier League debut for FC Arsenal Tula on 6 August 2016 in a game against FC Rubin Kazan.

External links
 
 

1985 births
People from Seversk
Living people
Russian footballers
Association football defenders
FC Sibir Novosibirsk players
FC Salyut Belgorod players
FC SKA-Khabarovsk players
FC Sokol Saratov players
FC Arsenal Tula players
FC Tambov players
FC Neftekhimik Nizhnekamsk players
FC Tom Tomsk players
FC Smena Komsomolsk-na-Amure players
Russian Premier League players
Russian First League players
Russian Second League players
FC Urozhay Krasnodar players
Sportspeople from Tomsk Oblast